3-Methyl-2-pentanone (methyl sec-butyl ketone) is an aliphatic ketone and isomer of 2-hexanone. It is used as a solvent and as an intermediate for syntheses. Its industrial importance is low. It is produced by base-catalyzed aldol condensation of 2-butanone with acetaldehyde, forming 4-hydroxy-3-methyl-2-pentanone, which is dehydrated to 3-methyl-3-penten-2-one over an acid catalyst, followed by hydrogenation over a palladium catalyst.

References 

Ketone solvents
Hexanones